"Your Love" is a song by contemporary Christian musician Brandon Heath from his third album, Leaving Eden. It was released on September 14, 2010 as the first single from the album. This song achieved the No. 1 spot on the Christian Songs Chart on January 22, 2011, and was on the chart for 27 weeks.  In addition, the song got to No. 20 on the Heatseekers Songs Chart on February 5, 2011, and was on the chart for three weeks.  This song was the No. 5 song of the year on the Christian Songs chart.  "Your Love" is nominated for Best Contemporary Christian Music Song at the 54th Grammy Awards.

"Your Love" also features on the compilation album WOW Hits 2012, and the film soundtrack Courageous.

Background 
The song's meaning is about God's great love for his creation and believers, and it is a song that leads believers to a sense of direction and guides them on the appropriate pathway.

Charts

Weekly charts

Decade-end charts

References 

2010 singles
Brandon Heath songs
Songs written by Jason Ingram
Songs written by Brandon Heath
2010 songs
Reunion Records singles